Andrew Weinberg (born 1976) is an American television writer, known for his work on Late Night with Conan O'Brien and The Tonight Show with Conan O'Brien.  He is also a co-creator and co-writer of the television series Eagleheart (TV series). The quarter-hour series is a parody of action crime dramas like Walker, Texas Ranger and originated in Conan O'Brien's Conaco Prods.

Awards
Weinberg and his fellow writers for Late Night with Conan O'Brien were awarded the Emmy Award in 2007, and were nominees in 2001, 2002, 2003, 2004, 2005, 2006, 2008 and 2009.  In 2006, they were awarded the Writers Guild of America Award. On Late Night with Conan O'Brien, Weinberg plays character Shoeverine, Heavy Hands Harry, among others.

Education
Weinberg received his bachelor's degree from Cornell University in 1998.

Association 
Weinberg joined the Phi Kappa Psi fraternity at Cornell University, and through that organization, the Irving Literary Society.

References

Cornell University alumni
Living people
1976 births
American male screenwriters